Nallah Mar or Mar Canal (also known as Mar Kol) was a navigational canal running through the old city of Srinagar, Jammu and Kashmir. It connected the Brari Nambal lagoon to the Khushal Sar lake and thus provided navigability between the Dal and Aanchar lakes. It was filled up and converted to a road in the 1970s.

History 
The canal was built during the reign of Sultan Zain-ul-Abidin (popularly known in Kashmir as 'Budshah'). It was considered as a lifeline of the city even up to the early part of the 20th century. However, with the arrival of motor transport, it gradually lost its sheen. As such, it was filled up to pave way for a road through the old city. The filling up of the canal is considered an ecological disaster as it led to the choking up of Brari Nambal and in turn affected the entire water system of the city.

Maps

References

Further reading

External links 

Canals in Jammu and Kashmir
Canals in Srinagar